The Rendiconti del Seminario Matematico Università e Politecnico di Torino  is a quarterly peer-reviewed mathematical journal published by the University of Turin and the Polytechnic University of Turin. It is the official journal of the Seminario Matematico dell'Università e Politecnico di Torino. It publishes research papers, invited lectures, and conference proceedings (special issues). Noticeable among invited lectures are the Lezioni Lagrangiane, a series of lectures which explore recent scientific progress and future developments in different fields of mathematics and are targeted to a wide public. The journal was established as the Conferenze di Fisica e di Matematica in 1929, obtaining its current name in 1947. The editor in chief is Emilio Musso (Polytechnic of Turin).

Historical notice

Foundation
The journal was founded in 1929 as “Conferenze di Fisica e di Matematica della Reale Università e della Reale Scuola di Ingegneria di Torino”: this name was chosen due to opposition of Carlo Somigliana to the use of the term "Seminario".

See also
Rendiconti del Seminario Matematico della Università di Padova
Rendiconti di Matematica e delle sue Applicazioni
Rivista di Matematica della Università di Parma

Notes

References

.
.

External links

Mathematics journals
Publications established in 1929
Academic journals associated with universities and colleges
Open access journals
Quarterly journals
Multilingual journals
University of Turin